James Shaw (sometimes credited as Jimmy Shaw) is a founder and lead guitarist of Canadian indie rock band Metric. He is also a member of the band Broken Social Scene and an award-winning producer.

Life and career
Shaw was born in London, England and raised in Bellevue, Ontario, Canada. He spent three years earning a classical music education at the Juilliard Music School in New York. Upon returning to Toronto, Ontario, Canada, he met Emily Haines, and the two began dating and making music immediately. In 1997, Haines was featured in Shaw's debut album "Life on the Clock", and the two formed the band Metric in 1998. Shaw's early efforts to make sure that former high school friends Haines and Kevin Drew remained friends helped the evolution of the band Broken Social Scene.

Shaw produced the debut album of the Montreal band The Lovely Feathers (who toured with Metric in 2005).

He is the owner of Giant Studios in Toronto, formerly with Sebastien Grainger, member of Death From Above 1979.

In 2010, he was nominated along with bandmate Emily Haines for the Juno Award for Songwriter of the Year. In 2013 he won the Juno Award for Producer of the Year for the songs "Youth Without Youth" and "Breathing Underwater" from Metric's album Synthetica.

Shaw performed with Broken Social Scene on The Late Show with Stephen Colbert March 30, 2017.

References

External links

Canadian songwriters
Canadian record producers
Musicians from Toronto
Writers from Toronto
Living people
Canadian new wave musicians
Broken Social Scene members
Best Original Song Genie and Canadian Screen Award winners
Jack Richardson Producer of the Year Award winners
Metric (band) members
Canadian indie rock musicians
Year of birth missing (living people)